Bringer Of Evil is the debut album by the Swedish heavy metal band Syron Vanes released in 1984. It was produced by Darryl Johnston.
It was remastered 2012 with two bonus tracks added.

Background
The album was recorded in record producer Darryl Johnston's studio.

The studio was located in Darryl's house in Kingston upon Hull in England. 
The record company Ebony Records was also located in the same building at the second floor.
The album was recorded to analog tape and the final release media was on vinyl.
All the songs were recorded in 5 days and was entirely played live in the studio as opposed to the more popular method recording each musician separately used today.

As Anders Hahne (guitar) recalls the studio was very small. The recording room was the size of a medium living room and the control room the size of a small bedroom.

The album title was from the beginning "Born To Rock" but Darryl didn't like it so it was changed to "Bringer Of Evil".
While the band was in the studio they witnessed the first order of 5000 album from a USA distributor.

The songs "Bringer Of Evil", "Suicide" and "Born To Rock" are still performed live to this day.

Artwork
This is the only album featuring their original "Old English Gothic" logo, the kind used by the band until it changed in 1985. The old logo is still popular today as it appears on some merchandise as T-shirts and other items. The artwork is designed by Terry Greer and the snake symbolizes the S in Syron, while the two arrows together symbolize the V in Vanes.

Remaster
2012 the band got contacted by Primo Bonali from the Italian record company Steelheart Memories. He wanted to release the album on CD for the first time.
There was an issue, because no one knew where the original tapes were stored. Rimbert did remember though that he gave his mother a copy in 1984 and he was sure it has never been out of its package. He was correct; it was completely untouched.
The remaster is digitized from vinyl, so any cracks and pops are digitally removed.
The album was digitally remastered and reissued 2012. The remaster have the same cover as the original vinyl but includes many unpublished pictures of the band during that era.

It also includes two bonus tracks:
"Violation" from a compilation album the group appeared on in 1982, and a demo track from 1983 called "Steal And Run".

Track listing

2012 Remaster including bonus tracks

Personnel
Syron Vanes
 Anders Hahne (Andy Seymore) — Guitar
 Rimbert Vahlstroem (Rimmy Hunter) — Guitar
 Erik Briselius (Rix Volin) — Vocals
 Staffan Lindstedt (Stephen Mavrock) — Drums
 Arne Sandved (Ace Greensmith) — Bass

Production
 Produced by Darryl Johnston
 Recorded at Ebony studios
 Sleeve artwork by Terry Greer
 Band photograph by  Ola Nilzzon
 Published by Ebony Records
Production remaster and bonus tracks
 Mastered by Anders Hahne
 Violation recorded at GS Studios Sweden 1982
 Steal and run recorded at Morges studio Sweden 1983
 Published by Steelheart Records

References

External links
 Official Syron Vanes website

1984 albums
Syron Vanes albums